The Women's 100 Individual Medley (or I.M.) at the 10th FINA World Swimming Championships (25m) took place 16–17 December 2010 in Dubai, United Arab Emirates. The preliminary heats and semifinals were swum on 16 December; the final on 17 December.

66 individuals swam the event.

Records
Prior to the competition, the existing world and championship records were as follows.

The following records were established during the competition:

Results

Heats

Semifinals
Semifinal 1

Semifinal 2

Final

References

Individual medley 100 metre, Women's
World Short Course Swimming Championships
2010 in women's swimming